The Fars is a river of southwest Russia, a left tributary of the Laba. It flows through the Republic of Adygea. The Fars is 197 kilometer long. It has a catchment area of 1450 square kilometers. The Psefir is a right tributary.

References 

Rivers of Adygea